Results of Rally Argentina (27º Rally Argentina), 6th round of 2007 World Rally Championship, was run on May 3–6:



Results

Retirements 
  Kristian Sohlberg - mechanical - accident (SS12);
  Petter Solberg - mechanical - engine (SS17);
  Nasser Al-Attiyah - mechanical - lost wheel (SS18);
  Leszek Kuzaj - mechanical - lost wheel (SS18);
  Amjad Farrah - mechanical (SS19);
  Stefano Marrini - mechanical - radiator (SS20);
  Fumio Nutahara - mechanical - fuel tank (SS21);
  Spyros Pavlides - mechanical - suspension (SS21);
  Loris Baldacci - mechanical - driveshaft (SS22);
  Fabio Frisiero - mechanical - turbo (SS22);
  Mirco Baldacci - mechanical - engine (SS22);

Special Stages 
All dates and times are ART (UTC-3).

Championship standings after the event

Drivers' championship

Manufacturers' championship

External links 
 Results on official site - WRC.com
 Results on eWRC-results.com
 Results on RallyBase.nl

Argentina
2007
Rally